Rathnapureeswarar Temple is a Hindu temple located in Thirunattiyathangudi in the Tiruvarur district of Tamil Nadu, India. The presiding deity is Shiva.

Legend 
According to legend, when the Chola king Ratnendra Chola tried to partition diamonds in the treasury with his brother but was unable to reach a compromise. At this juncture, Shiva is believed to have appeared to the brothers as a diamond merchant and facilitated the division. In gratitude, Ratnendra Chola built the temple.

Significance 
Thirunattiyathangudi is considered to be the birthplace of Kotpuli Nayanar, one of the 63 Nayanmars. Hymns praise of the temple have been sung by Sundarar in the Thevaram.

References 
 

Shiva temples in Tiruvarur district